Tasman District is a local government district in the northwest of the South Island of New Zealand. It borders the Canterbury Region, West Coast Region, Marlborough Region and Nelson City. It is administered by the Tasman District Council, a unitary authority, which sits at Richmond, with community boards serving outlying communities in Motueka and Golden Bay / Mohua. The city of Nelson has its own unitary authority separate from Tasman District, and together they comprise a single region in some contexts, but not for local government functions or resource management (planning) functions.

Name
Tasman Bay, the largest indentation in the north coast of the South Island, was named after Dutch seafarer, explorer and merchant Abel Tasman. He was the first European to discover New Zealand on 13 December 1642 while on an expedition for the Dutch East India Company. Tasman Bay passed the name on to the adjoining district, which was formed in 1989 largely from the merger of Waimea and Golden Bay counties.

History

According to tradition, the Māori waka Uruao brought ancestors of the  Waitaha people to Tasman Bay in the 12th century. Archaeological evidence suggests that early Māori settlers explored the region thoroughly, settling mainly along the coast where there was ample food.

The succession of tribes into the area suggests considerable warfare interrupted the settlement process. Around 1828, Ngati Toa (under Te Rauparaha) and the allied northern tribes of Ngāti Rārua and Ngāti Tama started their invasion of the South Island. They took over much of the area from Farewell Spit to the Wairau River.

British immigrant ships from England arrived in  Nelson in 1842 and European settlement of the region began under the leadership of Captain Arthur Wakefield. From 1853 to 1876 the area of the present-day Tasman District formed part of Nelson Province.

In the 1850s agriculture and pastoral farming started and villages developed on the  Waimea Plains and at Motueka. In 1856 the discovery of gold near  Collingwood sparked New Zealand's first gold rush. Significant reserves of iron ore were found at Onekaka, where an ironworks operated during the 1920s and 1930s.

Fruit-growing started at the end of the 19th century. By 1945, it was making a significant contribution to the local economy, and that importance continues today. The District Council website says that Tasman is New Zealand's main hop-growing area.

As an administrative unit of  local government, the Tasman District  formed in 1989 within the Nelson-Marlborough Regional Council. The Tasman District Council became a unitary authority in 1992.

Geography
Tasman District is a large area at the western corner of the north end of the South Island of New Zealand. It covers 9,616 square kilometres and is bounded on the west by the Matiri Ranges, Tasman Mountains and the Tasman Sea.

To the north Tasman and Golden Bays form its seaward edge, and the eastern boundary extends to the edge of Nelson city, and includes part of the Spencer Mountains and the Saint Arnaud and Richmond Ranges. The Victoria Ranges form Tasman's southern boundary and the district's highest point is Mount Franklin, at 2,340 metres.

The landscape is diverse, from large mountainous areas to valleys and plains, and is sliced by such major rivers as the Buller, Motueka, Aorere, Tākaka and Wairoa. The limestone-rich area around Mount Owen and Mount Arthur is notable for its extensive cave networks, among them New Zealand's deepest caves at Ellis Basin and Nettlebed. There is abundant bush and bird life, golden sand beaches, the unique 40-kilometre sands of Farewell Spit, and good fishing in the bays and rivers. These assets make the district a popular destination for tourists.

Tasman is home to three national parks: Abel Tasman National Park (New Zealand's smallest at 225.41 km2), Nelson Lakes National Park (1,017.53 km2) and Kahurangi National Park (4,520 km2).

Demography
The population density was  people per km2.

Tasman District had a population of 52,389 at the 2018 New Zealand census, an increase of 5,232 people (11.1%) since the 2013 census, and an increase of 7,764 people (17.4%) since the 2006 census. There were 19,545 households. There were 26,028 males and 26,361 females, giving a sex ratio of 0.99 males per female. The median age was 46.0 years (compared with 37.4 years nationally), with 9,534 people (18.2%) aged under 15 years, 7,626 (14.6%) aged 15 to 29, 24,258 (46.3%) aged 30 to 64, and 10,974 (20.9%) aged 65 or older.

Ethnicities were 92.6% European/Pākehā, 8.7% Māori, 1.6% Pacific peoples, 2.8% Asian, and 2.0% other ethnicities. People may identify with more than one ethnicity.

The percentage of people born overseas was 18.8, compared with 27.1% nationally.

Although some people objected to giving their religion, 58.7% had no religion, 30.2% were Christian, 0.3% were Hindu, 0.1% were Muslim, 0.9% were Buddhist and 2.0% had other religions.

Of those at least 15 years old, 7,479 (17.5%) people had a bachelor or higher degree, and 8,394 (19.6%) people had no formal qualifications. The median income was $28,800, compared with $31,800 nationally. 5,637 people (13.2%) earned over $70,000 compared to 17.2% nationally. The employment status of those at least 15 was that 20,061 (46.8%) people were employed full-time, 7,623 (17.8%) were part-time, and 1,038 (2.4%) were unemployed.

The main iwi represented in the wider Tasman region are Ngati Rarua, Ngati Tama (Golden Bay / Mohua and Tasman Bay / Te Tai-o-Aorere), Te Atiawa, Ngati Koata, Ngati Kuia (eastern Tasman Bay / Te Tai-o-Aorere) and the Poutini Ngāi Tahu (southern areas).

In Tasman District, German is the second most-spoken language after English, whereas in most regions of New Zealand Māori is the second most-spoken language.

Famous former residents include the "father of nuclear physics" Sir Ernest Rutherford, former Prime Ministers Bill Rowling and Sir Keith Holyoake, and Sir Michael Myers, Chief Justice of New Zealand 1929–1946.

Urban areas and settlements 
The Tasman District has six towns with a population over 1,000. Together they are home to % of the district's population.

Other towns and settlements include the following:

Golden Bay Ward:
 Collingwood
 Pohara/Ligar Bay/Tata Beach/Tarakohe/Wainui
 Tākaka
Lakes-Murchison Ward:
 Murchison
 Saint Arnaud
 Tapawera

Motueka Ward:
 Kaiteriteri
 Mārahau
 Motueka
 Riwaka
Moutere-Waimea Ward:
 Brightwater
 Māpua–Ruby Bay
 Tasman
 Upper Moutere
 Wakefield
Richmond Ward:
 Richmond

Government
Tasman District Council (unitary authority) headquarters are at Richmond, close to the adjoining Nelson City, which is  further north. The head of local government is the mayor. Community Boards exist to serve outlying areas in Motueka and Golden Bay.

Economy
The sub-national GDP of the Nelson region (Tasman District and Nelson City) was estimated at US$2.343 billion in 2003, 2% of New Zealand's national GDP.

References

External links

 Tasman District Council

 
Territorial authorities of New Zealand